Onebala probolaspis is a moth in the family Gelechiidae. It was described by Edward Meyrick in 1929. It is found in South Africa.

The wingspan is about 11 mm. The ground colour of the forewings is brown, but this is little visible. The basal area is glossy leaden grey, enclosing an elongate blackish white-edged median blotch from the base to one-fourth, with some dark fuscous suffusion towards the dorsum beneath this, and a light glossy leaden-grey white-edged fascia from the upper end of this area to the dorsum beyond middle limits a large irregularly rounded triangular blackish-fuscous white-edged dorsal blotch. There is a rather angulated light leaden-grey fascia from the middle of the costa confluent with the preceding fascia near the dorsum, this fascia includes a wedge-shaped streak of ground colour becoming black towards the costa. Beyond this, a white sinuate line runs from three-fifths of the costa to the dorsum before the tornus, followed on the costal half first by a blackish blotch and then a quadrate white apical blotch. There is also a smaller leaden-grey blotch on the lower half of the termen and a dark fuscous terminal line. The hindwings are grey.

References

Endemic moths of South Africa
Moths described in 1929
Onebala